Alan Hamilton Loxton (13 April 1920 – 29 March 2004) was the senior partner at Allen, Allen and Hemsley, Australia's oldest law firm, President of the Law Society of New South Wales and a company director.

Early life
Loxton was born in Sydney and educated at Newington College (1931–1933), The Scots College, and the University of Sydney, where he graduated in Law in 1949. He was a resident of St. Andrew's College, Sydney during his university years.

War service
Loxton served with the Second Australian Imperial Force during World War II (1940–1945) rising to the rank of lieutenant in the 2nd/18th Battalion. He was a prisoner of war in Malaya (1942–1945).

Legal career
In 1949, Loxton commenced practising as a solicitor at Allen, Allen & Hemsley and became a partner in 1951. From 1973 until 1975, Loxton was president of the Law Society of New South Wales.

Club membership
From 1987 to 1990 Loxton was President of the Australian Club in Sydney.

Company directorships
Loxton was a director of various public companies:
 AMEV Finance Ltd.
 Noble Lowndes International Holdings Pty., Ltd.

Educational governance
Loxton was on the boards of various educational institutions:
 Chairman, Unisearch Ltd (1977–1985)
 Council member, University of New South Wales (1977–1985)
 Council member, Ku-ring-gai College of Advanced Education (1977–1982)
 Chairman, Sydney College of Law (1975–1982)
 Member, Solicitor's Admission Board (1971–1973)

Honours
 Member of the Order of Australia (1991) for service to education and the law

References

1920 births
People educated at Newington College
Sydney Law School alumni
Lawyers from Sydney
Members of the Order of Australia
2004 deaths
People educated at Scots College (Sydney)